This is a list of films written, produced or directed by Ed Wood. Acting roles are also noted.

References

Male actor filmographies
Director filmographies
Filmography
American filmographies